Milutin Osmajić (born 25 July 1999) is a Montenegrin professional footballer who plays as either a winger or a forward for Portuguese club Vizela, on loan from Spanish Cádiz CF, and the Montenegro national team.

Club career
Osmajić began his career with FK Sutjeska Nikšić, making his senior debut in March 2018. He helped his side to win the 2018–19 Montenegrin First League, and was also the club's second-best goalscorer in 2020–21, with 13 goals.

On 9 July 2021, Osmajić signed a three-year deal with La Liga side Cádiz CF. He made his top tier debut on 14 August, coming on in the 70th minute for Anthony Lozano in a 1–1 draw with Levante UD.

On 31 January 2022, Osmajić was loaned to Turkish side Bandırmaspor until June. On 10 August, he switched teams and countries again after agreeing to a one-year loan deal with Portuguese Primeira Liga side F.C. Vizela.

International career
Osmajić made his international debut for Montenegro on 11 November 2020 in a friendly match against Kazakhstan.

Career statistics

International

International goals

Honours
Sutjeska
Montenegrin First League: 2018–19

References

External links
 
 
 

1999 births
Living people
Footballers from Podgorica
Montenegrin footballers
Montenegro under-21 international footballers
Montenegro international footballers
Association football wingers
Association football forwards
FK Sutjeska Nikšić players
Montenegrin First League players
La Liga players
Segunda Federación players
Süper Lig players
Cádiz CF B players
Cádiz CF players
Bandırmaspor footballers
F.C. Vizela players
Montenegrin expatriate footballers
Montenegrin expatriate sportspeople in Spain
Montenegrin expatriate sportspeople in Turkey
Montenegrin expatriate sportspeople in Portugal
Expatriate footballers in Spain
Expatriate footballers in Turkey
Expatriate footballers in Portugal